Czerlonka  is a village in the administrative district of Gmina Białowieża, within Hajnówka County, Podlaskie Voivodeship, in north-eastern Poland, close to the border with Belarus.

The village has a population of 120.

References

Czerlonka
Białowieża Forest